WTKG (1230 AM) is a radio station broadcasting a news/talk/sports format consisting of news and sports. Licensed to Grand Rapids, Michigan, United States, and now owned by iHeartMedia, Inc., Previous to adopting the current calls and format in 1997, the station played country under the WJEF (the station on which radio Hall of Famer Wally Phillips started his career) and WCUZ calls.

History
The station began as WJEF (1230 AM) on February 8, 1945 with studios located on the 10th floor of the Pantlind Hotel (Amway Grand Plaza Hotel) in Downtown Grand Rapids, Mi. It's ERP at that time was 250 Watts. It would be Grand Rapids 3rd radio station behind WOOD (AM) and WLAV-AM. It also was a sister station to WKZO (590 AM) in Kalamazoo which was also owned by John E. Fetzer.  In 1951, WJEF would gain an FM sister station in WJEF-FM (WBCT)(93.7).  The AM station was sold to Pathfinder Communications in 1973 and would take on the WCUZ calls on June 18 of 1973. WCUZ-AM and later WCUZ-AM/FM would be Grand Rapids only country music station until 1992 when in a weird twist of fate, former FM sister WBCT ended WCUZ's hold on the Grand Rapids country music radio audience. During the early 1980s the station would begin broadcasting in AM stereo with the Magnavox system.  However AM Stereo broadcasting would end when the Motorola C-QUAM standard won out. In 1992 WCUZ-AM's former sister station WBCT (93.7)(WJEF and later WJFM-FM)would also be sold by Fetzer Broadcasting.  WBCT flipped to a country format and went head to head with WCUZ.  In the end WBCT would win out, likely due to the facts that WBCT has a grandfathered 320,000 watt superpower  signal and (more likely) because they targeted the younger generation of listeners recently discovering country music.

Bronco Radio Network
WTKG was an affiliate of the Western Michigan University "Broncos Radio Network" and carried all of the Broncos football and men's basketball games. WTKG was dropped as an affiliate after WMAX was added for both sports.

References
Michiguide.com - WTKG History

External links
FCC History Cards for WTKG

TKG
Radio stations established in 1945
1945 establishments in Michigan
IHeartMedia radio stations